André Malherbe (21 March 1956 – 24 November 2022) was a Belgian professional Grand Prix motocross racer. He competed in the Motocross World Championships from 1975 to 1986, most prominently as a member of the Honda factory racing team where he won three FIM 500cc Motocross World Championships. In 1984, Malherbe was named the recipient of the Belgian National Sports Merit Award.

Motorcycle racing career
Born in Huy, the son of a motorcycle dealer, Malherbe began racing at an early age and earned his racing licence in 1973. He rode a Zündapp to win the 1973 FIM 125cc European motocross championship, and repeated as champion in 1974.

Malherbe finished the 1977 season third in the 250cc motocross world championship. Malherbe moved up to the 500cc world championship in 1978 and finished the season as the highest scoring KTM rider in sixth place. He joined the Honda factory racing team in 1979 and improved to a third-place finish behind Honda teammate Graham Noyce and Suzuki's Gerrit Wolsink in the 500cc world championship.

In 1980, he captured his first 500cc world championship as a member of the Honda factory racing team. Malherbe successfully defended his title in 1981 and in 1984 he won his third 500cc world championship for Honda. At the time of his retirement, Malherbe's 41 Grand Prix race victories placed him fourth on the all-time winners list.

After his motocross career ended, he competed in the 1987 Spa 24 Hour round of the World Touring Car Championship. He then began to compete in rally raids. While competing in the 1988 Paris to Dakar Rally he crashed and suffered serious injuries that left him paralyzed.

Personal life and death
Malherbe died on 24 November 2022, at the age of 66.

References 

1956 births
2022 deaths
People from Huy
Sportspeople from Liège Province
Belgian motocross riders
People with paraplegia
Belgian racing drivers
24 Hours of Spa drivers
20th-century Belgian people